This is a list of members of the Tasmanian House of Assembly between the 11 December 1976 election and the 28 July 1979 election.

Notes
  Labor MHA for Franklin and Premier of Tasmania, Bill Neilson, resigned from cabinet and from Parliament on 1 December 1977. Bill McKinnon was elected as his replacement at a recount on 12 December 1977.

Sources
 Parliament of Tasmania (2006). The Parliament of Tasmania from 1856

Members of Tasmanian parliaments by term
20th-century Australian politicians